Clanculus clangulus is a species of sea snail, a marine gastropod mollusk in the family Trochidae, the top snails.

Description
The size of the shell varies between 10 mm and 13 mm. The shell has a conical shape, with decidedly higher spire generally than Clanculus floridus. It is subcarinate, nearly rounded at the periphery, and very deeply umbilicated. Its color is brownish, or, more frequently a beautiful emerald green, much paler below. The upper surface is broadly radiately maculate with crimson, the flames not extending below the periphery, which, with the base, is dotted with the same shade. The spire is usually attenuated toward the acute rose-colored apex. The about 6 whorls are convex, the last one deflected anteriorly. They are spirally sculptured with about 18 closely granose cinguli, of which 5 to 8 principal ones are above the periphery. Their interstices bear granose riblets, and sharp oblique striae. On old individuals the disparity in the size of the lirae of the upper surface is often scarcely apparent. The base of the shell bears much finer, closer, granulose lirae. The aperture is very oblique and has a subtetragonal form. The outer lip is plicate within. The tooth near the superior angle is slightly developed. Other details of aperture and umbilicus are the same as in Clanculus personatus, save that the parietal area is scarcely wrinkled.

Distribution
This marine species is endemic to Australia and occurs off New South Wales and Queensland.

References

 Wood, W. 1828. Index Testaceologicus; or A Catalogue of Shells, British and Foreign, arranged according to the Linnean system. London : Taylor Supplement, 1-59, pls 1-8
 Philippi, R.A. 1852. Trochidae. pp. 233–248 in Küster, H.C. (ed). Systematisches Conchylien-Cabinet von Martini und Chemnitz. Nürnberg : Bauer & Raspe Vol. 2.
 Angas, G.F. 1867. A list of species of marine Mollusca found in Port Jackson harbour, New South Wales and on the adjacent coasts, with notes on their habits etc. Proceedings of the Zoological Society of London 1867: 185-233, 912-935
 Fischer, P. 1877. Genres Calcar, Trochus, Xenophora, Tectarius et Risella. pp. 115–240 in Keiner, L.C. (ed.). Spécies general et iconographie des coquilles vivantes. Paris : J.B. Baillière Vol. 11.
 Watson, R.B. 1886. Report on the Scaphopoda and Gastropoda collected by the H.M.S. "Challenger" during the years 1873-1876. Report on the Scientific Results of the Voyage of H.M.S. Challenger 1873–1876, Zoology 15(42): 756 pp., 50 pls 
 Brazier, J. 1889. Notes and critical remarks on a donation of shells sent to the Museum of the Conchological Society of Great Britain and Ireland. Journal of Conchology 6: 66-84
 Whitelegge, T. 1889. List of the Marine and Freshwater Invertebrate Fauna of Port Jackson and the Neighbourhood. Journal and Proceedings of the Royal Society of New South Wales 23: 1-161
 Henn, A.U. & Brazier, J.W. 1894. List of Mollusca found at Green Point, Watson's Bay, Sydney. With a few remarks upon some of the most interesting species and descriptions of new species. Proceedings of the Linnean Society of New South Wales 2 9: 165-182 
 Iredale, T. & McMichael, D.F. 1962. A reference list of the marine Mollusca of New South Wales. Memoirs of the Australian Museum 11: 1-109
 Wilson, B.R. & Gillett, K. 1982. The colourful shells of Australia. How to identify them. Sydney : AH & AW Reed 288 pp
 Wilson B. (1993) Australian marine shells. Prosobranch gastropods. Vol. 1. Odyssey Publishing, Kallaroo, Western Australia, 408 pp
 Jansen, P. 1995. A review of the genus Clanculus Montfort, 1810 (Gastropoda: Trochidae) in Australia, with description of a new subspecies and the introduction of a nomen novum. Vita Marina 43(1-2): 39-62

External links
 To Biodiversity Heritage Library (6 publications)
 To World Register of Marine Species
 

clangulus
Gastropods of Australia
Gastropods described in 1828